Dragon European Championship is an annual European sailing regatta in the Dragon class organised by the International Dragon Association.

Editions

Medalists

References

Dragon (keelboat) competitions
European championships in sailing
Recurring sporting events established in 1963